Godfrey Solo Oduor is a former Kenyan defender who currently serves as the assistant coach at Kenyan Premier League side KCB

Career
Godfrey played his club football at World Hope F.C. Tusker F.C. and  KCB. Before joining KCB, he had served as the head coach of second-tier side Kibera Black Stars and Kenyan Premier League side Nzoia Sugar F.C. 

He also serves as the assistant coach of Kenya National Women's team, Harambee Starlets.

References

External links

Living people
Year of birth missing (living people)
Kenyan footballers
Football managers in Kenya